Captain Ruth Alice Erickson (1913-2008) was the Director of the United States Navy Nurse Corps, serving in that position from 1962 to 1966. As a lieutenant in the Navy Nurse Corps, she witnessed the Japanese attack on Pearl Harbor, Hawaii on 7 December 1941.

Early life
Ruth Alice Erickson was born in 1913 in Virginia, Minnesota.  She graduated from Methodist Kahler School of Nursing in Rochester, Minnesota in 1934.

Navy Nurse Corps career
Ruth Erickson joined the Navy Nurse Corps in July 1936.  During her career she served on the hospital ship Relief, witnessed the Japanese attack on Pearl Harbor, and served on the hospital ship Haven while bringing home prisoners of war from Japan in 1945. Erickson moved through positions of increasing responsibility, including nursing supervisor, senior nurse and assistant chief of nursing services at various naval hospitals, Nurse Corps representative in the 12th Naval District and Military Sea Transport Service in Seattle, WA, and personnel officer for the Nurse Corps at the  Bureau of Medicine and Surgery in Washington, D. C. She served as chief nurse at three major naval hospitals and, on 30 April 1962 became the Director of the Navy Nurse Corps.  She retired from the U. S. Navy on 1 May 1966.

Education
Erickson earned a Bachelor of Science degree in Nursing Education from Indiana University in 1953.

See also

United States Navy Nurse Corps

References

Further reading

External links
Nurses and the U.S. Navy -- Overview and Special Image Selection Naval Historical Center
Oral History of LT Ruth Erickson about the attack on Pearl Harbor
Washington Post Obituary

1913 births
2008 deaths
American nursing administrators
Female wartime nurses
United States Navy personnel of World War II
United States Navy personnel of the Korean War
Female United States Navy officers
World War II nurses
Korean War nurses
United States Navy Nurse Corps officers
People from Virginia, Minnesota
20th-century American women
21st-century American women
Military personnel from Minnesota